Billboard Candid Covers was an American live music web series created by Billboard, distributed on their website. The series premiered on May 22, 2012. Each Tuesday, artists perform "songs from music stars who helped inspire their careers" Nikon was the presenting sponsor.

One blog called Tristan Prettyman's cover "beautiful". The second season featured Women in Music, and "spotlights emerging female artists performing songs from the female music stars who helped inspire their careers". "We were lifetime fans and she was always an influence," said Tegan & Sara of their Cyndi Lauper cover. The third season premiered with Fifth Harmony.

Episodes

Season 1 (2012)

Season 2 (2012)

Season 3 (2013)

References

External links
 Candid Covers presented by Nikon playlist

American non-fiction web series